The 2004 season is the 53rd year in Guangzhou Football Club's existence, their 39th season in the Chinese football league and the 13th season in the professional football league.

Chinese football clubs 2004 season
Guangzhou F.C. seasons